Eunoe spinosa is a scale worm described from the Sagami Sea, Japan at depths of about 80–100m.

Description
Number of segments 38; elytra 15 pairs. No distinct pigmentation pattern. Prostomium anterior margin comprising a pair of acute anterior projections. Lateral antennae inserted ventrally (beneath prostomium and median antenna). Elytra marginal fringe of papillae present. Notochaetae about as thick as neurochaetae. Bidentate neurochaetae absent.

References

Phyllodocida